Buchananisen is a glacier in Prins Karls Forland, Svalbard. The glacier has a width of about twelve kilometers. It is split into two parts by the ridge of Buchananryggen. It is named after Arctic explorer John Young Buchanan.

References 

Glaciers of Spitsbergen